Ulita (Ölöti, or Оло-Туу, Olo-Tuu) is a rural locality (a selo) in Ongudaysky District, the Altai Republic, Russia. The population was 266 as of 2016. There are 3 streets.

Geography 
Ulita is located 9 km southeast of Onguday (the district's administrative centre) by road. Onguday is the nearest rural locality.

References 

Rural localities in Ongudaysky District